A neuropeptide receptor is a type of peptide receptor which binds one or more neuropeptides.

An example is the μ-opioid receptor, which binds to and is activated by the neuropeptide β-endorphin.

See also
 Neurotransmitter receptor

References

External links
 

Neuropeptides
Receptors